Patty Thomas was an American dancer, USO entertainer and actress. She appeared in the 1961 film The Ladies Man, 1938 film You Can't Take It with You and toured with Bob Hope during and after World War II. Patty Thomas was born, Patricia Thomas, in on August 1, 1922 in Erie, Pennsylvania. She also was in the films: Smooth Sailing, a 1947 short film by Jerry Hopper and the 2003 film Los no invitados.  She died on March 29, 2014 in Newport Beach, California.

Bob Hope Show
After doing shows with Laurel and Hardy for four years, Thomas joined state-side USO tours for 10 months in 1943. Hope saw Thomas tap dance in Hollywood and invited her to join the USO tour. Hope and Thomas both worked for Paramount Studios. Hope called his USO World War II military tour of the South Pacific in 1944: “Loew’s Malaria Circuit” and “the Pineapple Circuit”. Hope and Thomas did 150 shows in the two 1/2 months they were on road. Hope and Thomas would do Soft shoe dance together in the show and Thomas would do solo tap dance numbers. In 1944 Thomas and Hope, with singer Jerry Colona and Frances Langford and musician guitarist Tony Romano. Also on the tour were singer Gale Robbins, musicians June Brenner and Ruth Denas, and comedians Roger Price and Jack Pepper. The tours visited: Naval Base Pearl Harbor Hawaii at the Nimitz Bowl, Naval Base Eniwetok, Naval Base Cairns, Green Islands, Bougainville, Milner Bay, Naval Base Treasury Islands, Naval Base Mios Woendi called Wendy Island, and Naval Base Kwajalein. Thomas entertained Troops not just on stage, she danced on the hood of Jeeps and on boards placed in mud due to tropical storms. 

On 14 August 1944 Hope, Thomas, and his tour group had one scary detour on the tour the team was flying in a United States Navy Consolidated PBY Catalina, called Spare Gear seaplane in Australia and one of the engines stopped working. The crew ask that luggage be tossed out so the plane would be lighter and stay in the air longer. Thomas seeing everything going out the door, tied her tap dance shoes around her neck for safety and prayed. After tossing out the tools and emergency supplies, the plane made an unplanned landing on the Camden Haven River in Laurieton, New South Wales. The problem was a broken fuel line, that was repaired. The tour and plane crew stayed at a local hotel overnight. The group did a tour for the small town before continuing on to Naval Base Sydney. The flight had started in Naval Base New Guinea.<ref>Bob Hope's unexpected landing in Laurieton'ABC News</ref>

After the South Pacific tour Hope, Thomas and the tour did a European show. The European show did 13 shows in Germany: Bremen, Berlin, Bad Kissingen, Schweinfurt, Heidelberg, Furstenfeldbruck, Fritzlar, Kassel, Munich, Nuremberg and Mannheim. The tour was in Nuremberg when Germany surrendered. The tour visit Eagle's Nest Hitler's command in Germany. The tour was able to After German tours the Navy requested a show in Monte Carlo and the tour did a show there before heading home. The show also did a tour of Austria and Czechoslovakia as the war was coming to an end. Thomas was born in Pennsylvania but while young, she and her mother moved to California after her father died. Thomas joined The Bob Hope Shows': At bases in Alaska 12 Christmas shows in 1949 and Bob's 1st overseas USO Xmas show, filmed at Goose Air Base in Labrador and Thule Air Base in Greenland in 1954. In 1959, the 1944 tour, put on shows in Alaska.  

Thomas join Hope on The Colgate Comedy Hour: The Bob Hope Christmas Show in 1955. At the age of 16, she started working with dancing with Al Ross, her teacher, choreographer, and manager, her parents Howard and Anna Thomas had signed her up for dance lessons at a young age. At age 21 she was touring with Bob Hope. She celebrated her 22th birthday with Bob Hope at Naval Base Cairns in Queensland, Australia. In large venues, like the Nimitz Bowl, so the Troops could her tap dance Hope followed her around a microphone. Hope often told the troops I just wanted you boys to see what you’re fighting for. and introduced Thomas. Thomas visited troops in hospitals. Touring the tropical jungles Thomas got problems with her ears and later suffered hearing loss. After World War II, Thomas continued to tour and be friends with Bob Hope and Dolores Hope. The tours also made Thomas and Frances Langford close friends. Hope and Thomas did a  Bob Hope Independence Day Concert on 4 July 1945 at the Royal Albert Hall London.  Thomas appeared on Bob Hope television specials starting in 1950. 

LegacyWho Threw That Coconut! is book by Jerry Colonna about the 1944 tour with Hope, Thomas and tours. Entertaining the Troops (1988) is documentary on the 1944 USO tour.  Entertaining the Troops is noted as is has a reunion of Bob Hope's tour troupe, including Frances Langford, Patty Thomas and Tony Romano. Patty is also remembered in the 1995 TV Movie, Bob Hope: Memories of World War II''. Patty Thomas's Pith helmet from 1944 is on display at The National WWII Museum, it was given to her by troops of Group Pacific 7, a naval supply base in the Naval Base Marshall Islands.  The Library of Congress has a page on Patty Thomas and her service to the United States Armed Forces over the years.

Gallery

See also
US Naval Advance Bases
Chris Noel

References

External links
youtube.com Bob Hope introduces Patty Thomas who performs a dance for US soldiers
 youtube.com  1944 U.S.O. Show: Bob Hope, and Frances Langford, and Patty Thomas
youtube.com Patti Thomas, of U.S.O. Bob Hope Troupe, entertains troops with soldier volunteer
Library of Congress page on Patty Thomas

20th-century American actresses
American film actresses
American television actresses
21st-century American women
1922 births
2014 deaths
United Service Organizations entertainers
American female dancers
American tap dancers
Actresses from California